Senator Carey may refer to:

Members of the United States Senate
Joseph M. Carey (1845–1924), U.S. Senator from Wyoming from 1890 to 1895
Robert D. Carey (1878–1937), U.S. Senator from Wyoming from 1930 to 1937
Hugh L. Carey (1919-2011),  U.S. representative from New York from 1961 to 1974

United States state senate members
John Carey (Ohio state legislator) (born 1959), Ohio State Senate
John Carey (Wisconsin politician) (1839–1888), Wisconsin State Senate
Philip J. Carey (1918–1996), Illinois State Senate
Richard Carey (politician) (1929–2013), Maine State Senate

See also
Senator Cary (disambiguation)
List of people with surname Carey
John Kerry (born 1943), U.S. Senator from Massachusetts from 1985 to 2013